Neodiprion is a genus of sawflies in the family Diprionidae.

Species 
 Neodiprion abbotii
 Neodiprion abietis (Harris)
 Neodiprion autumnalis
 Neodiprion burkei Middleton
 Neodiprion compar
 Neodiprion dubiosus Schedl
 Neodiprion excitans Rohwer
 Neodiprion fabricii
 Neodiprion hetricki
 Neodiprion knereri
 Neodiprion lecontei (Fitch)
 Neodiprion maurus
 Neodiprion merkeli Ross
 Neodiprion nanulus Schedl
 Neodiprion nigroscutum
 Neodiprion pinetum (Norton)
 Neodiprion pinirigidae
 Neodiprion pratti (Dyar)
 Neodiprion rugifrons Middleton
 Neodiprion sertifer (Geoffroy)
 Neodiprion swainei Middleton
 Neodiprion taedae Ross
 Neodiprion tsugae Middleton
 Neodiprion virginiana
 Neodiprion warreni

References

External links 

 

Tenthredinoidea
Taxa named by Sievert Allen Rohwer
Insects described in 1918